"New Beginning"/"Bright Eyes" is the debut solo single of Irish singer-songwriter Stephen Gately. It also appeared on Gately's debut solo album, New Beginning. The song was released on 29 May 2000 in the United Kingdom and peaked at number three on the UK Singles Chart. The music video for "New Beginning" was directed by Simon Hilton and shot in London.

Track listings

UK CD1
 "New Beginning"
 "Bright Eyes"
 "New Beginning" (Love to Infinity mix)
 "New Beginning" (CD ROM video)

UK CD2
 "New Beginning"
 "Bright Eyes" (Jewels & Stone remix)
 "New Beginning" (Joey Musaphia's Genesis mix)
 "New Beginning" (CD ROM video)

UK cassette single
A. "New Beginning"
AA. "Bright Eyes"

European CD single
 "New Beginning" (radio edit) – 3:38
 "New Beginning" (Love to Infinity mix) – 3:30

European and Australian maxi-CD single
 "New Beginning" (radio edit) – 3:38
 "Bright Eyes" (Love to Infinity mix) – 6:45
 "New Beginning" (Joey Musaphia's Genesis mix) – 8:05

Personnel
Credits are lifted from the UK CD1 liner notes.

 Stephen Gately – writing, vocals
 Anders Bagge – writing
 Arnthor Birgisson – writing, background vocals
 Simon Climie – writing
 Anders Von Hoffsten – background vocals
 Esbjörn Öhrwall – guitar
 Patrick Tucker – guitar
 Stockholm Session Strings – strings

 Bag & Arnthor – production
 Jansson & Jansson – string arrangement
 Bob Kraushaar – mixing
 Patrick – mixing assistant
 Aaron Chakraverty – mastering
 Stylorouge – artwork design
 Tim Bret-Day – photography

Charts

References

2000 debut singles
2000 songs
A&M Records singles
Songs written by Anders Bagge
Songs written by Arnthor Birgisson
Songs written by Simon Climie
Songs written by Stephen Gately